O'Fallons is an unincorporated community in Lincoln County, Nebraska, United States.

History
O'Fallons was named from the O'Fallons Bluff nearby.

References

Unincorporated communities in Lincoln County, Nebraska
Unincorporated communities in Nebraska